Nii Amasah Namoale (born July 14, 1958) is a Ghanaian politician who served as  member of parliament for Dadekotopon constituency in the Greater Accra region of Ghana from 7 January 2009 to 7 January 2017.

Early life and education 
Namoale was born on July 14, 1958. He hails from La-Accra, a town in the Greater Accra Region of Ghana. He completed Ofori Panin Senior High School. He entered the University of Cape Coast, Ghana and obtained his Master of Philosophy degree in agronomy in 2000.

Career 
Namoale is an Agronomist by profession. He has worked as the assistant director in the Ministry of Food & Agriculture.

Politics 
Namoale is a member of the National Democratic Congress (NDC). He was elected on the ticket of the National Democratic Congress as the Member of parliament for the Dade Kotopon constituency in the 5th parliament of the 4th republic of Ghana. He was elected with 42,678 votes out of the 74,499 total valid votes cast, equivalent to  57.3% of total valid votes cast. He was elected over Francis Nii Annan Sowah of the New Patriotic Party and Cynthia Akua Mensah of the Convention People's Party. These obtained 40.37% and 2.34% respectively of total valid votes cast. In 2012, he contested for the Dadekotopon seat on the ticket of the NDC for representation in the sixth parliament of the fourth republic and won. He was defeated by Hon Vincent Sowah Odotei in the 2016 parliamentary election. He has worked as the Deputy Minister of Agriculture.

Personal life 
Namoale is a Christian (Church of Christ). He is married with three children.

References 

Living people
1958 births
National Democratic Congress (Ghana) politicians
Ghanaian MPs 2009–2013
Ghanaian MPs 2013–2017
University of Ibadan alumni
Ga-Adangbe people
People from Greater Accra Region
University of Cape Coast alumni